Bazzi is a surname with Lebanese (South Lebanon) origins. Notable people with the surname include:

 Ali Ahmad Bazzi, a member of the Lebanese Parliament (2000–present)
 Bazzi (singer) (born 1997), American singer-songwriter
 Elias Bazzi (born 1981), Argentine footballer
 Gian Bazzi (1931–2016), Swiss ice hockey player
 Khalid Bazzi (1969–2006), Hezbollah commander
 Mohamad Bazzi (born 1975), Lebanese-American journalist

Surnames of Lebanese origin